The 18477 / 18478 Kalinga Utkal Express is an important Express of Indian Railways connecting two pilgrimage centres of India, Yog Nagari Rishikesh and Puri.

Route & Halts 

Locomotive
It is hauled by Tughlakabad / Ghaziabad-based WAP-7 locomotive on its entire journey.

Rakes 
This train has total 5 rakes running between Puri & Haridwar.
The train has 24 coaches comprising  One A/C 2-Tier  Five A/C 3-tier   Twelve Sleeper class  Three General compartments (unreserved)  Two Luggage van (SLR) and  One pantry car.

Accidents
On 19 August 2017, the Kalinga-Utkal Express derailed with fourteen coaches of the train going off track in Khatauli in Uttar Pradesh, India. Heading to Haridwar in Uttarakhand from Puri in Odisha, the incident resulted in the death of 23 people while injuring 40 others. Minister for Railways, Suresh Prabhu, ordered an inquiry into the incident.

Notes

References

External links

 http://indiarailinfo.com/train/1698?kkk=1315073182616
 http://livetrainstatus.co.in/18477-utkal-express-running-status/
 http://livetrainstatus.co.in/18478-kalingautkalexp-running-status/

Trains from Haridwar
Named passenger trains of India
Transport in Puri
Rail transport in Odisha
Rail transport in Madhya Pradesh
Rail transport in West Bengal
Rail transport in Jharkhand
Rail transport in Chhattisgarh
Rail transport in Haryana
Rail transport in Rajasthan
Rail transport in Delhi
Express trains in India